Lophoruza lunifera is a moth of the family Noctuidae first described by Frederic Moore in 1885. It is found in Sri Lanka, Japan and Taiwan.

Gallery

References

Moths of Asia
Moths described in 1885
Acontiinae